Permaisuri Siti Aishah (Jawi: ڤرمايسوري سيتي عائشه; born Siti Aishah binti Abdul Rahman; born 18 November 1971) is the consort of the 11th Yang di-Pertuan Agong of Malaysia, Sultan Salahuddin Abdul Aziz Shah. She is the youngest ever Raja Permaisuri Agong (Queen) of Malaysia, ascending the throne at the age of 28 on 26 April 1999. During her reign as Raja Permaisuri Agong, she was known as Tuanku Siti Aishah.

Early life 
She was born on 18 November 1971 and grew up in Kuala Lumpur. She received her early education at the Jalan Gurney Primary School and her secondary education at the Puteri Titiwangsa Secondary School, Kuala Lumpur. She then furthered her studies in banking at the Kelantan branch campus of the Universiti Teknologi MARA (Formerly known as Institut Teknologi Mara) in Kota Bharu, Kelantan.

Marriage
Having married Sultan Salahuddin Abdul Aziz Shah ibni Almarhum Sultan Hisamuddin Alam Shah Al-Haj on 3 May 1990, she was made Che Puan Besar of Selangor. On 24 October 1998, she became Tengku Permaisuri of Selangor with style Duli Yang Maha Mulia Tengku Permaisuri Selangor, Tengku Permaisuri Siti Aishah.

The second commoner to become Raja Permaisuri Agong, she is believed to have remarried since the death of her husband the late king on 21 November 2001 - a claim which she has since denied.

Life after the death of Sultan Salahuddin
She came back into the public eye on New Year's Day 2006 for an exclusive interview by The Star Malaysia, where the newspaper had wrongly addressed by her former title, "Tuanku Siti Aishah". The Selangor Council of the Royal Court immediately responded that the widowed consort of the late Sultan of Selangor should instead be properly addressed as Her Highness Permaisuri Siti Aishah. The honorific title Yang Amat Mulia was in recognition of the Darjah Kerabat Yang Amat Dihormati (DK, The Most Honourable Royal Family Order of Selangor), which was conferred on her by her late husband.

In the interview, she talked about her life since the late king (whom she fondly referred to as Almarhum) died, how she coped with his death with her family's love and support, her nephews Abdul Aziz (whom the late king named after himself shortly before he died) and Abdul Azim as her solace, her role as the former queen of Malaysia, her relationship with the late king, and her hope to find love and remarry again, with her parents' blessings.

Permaisuri Siti Aishah was also the patron of the UiTM Alumni, Selangor Women’s Association, Selangor Girl Guides, Jantung Hatiku Society and Girl Guides Association of Malaysia.

Honours 
She was awarded:

Honours of Malaysia 
  : 
  Recipient of the Order of the Crown of the Realm (DMN, 1999)
  : 
  First Class of the Royal Family Order of Selangor (DK I, 8.3.1996)
  : 
  Knight Commander of the Order of the Star of Hornbill Sarawak (DA, 20.6.1994)

Foreign Honours 
  :
  Dame Grand Cross of the Order of Chula Chom Klao (1st Class) (27.3.2000)

References

See also
Yang Di-Pertuan Agong
Raja Permaisuri Agong

Living people
1971 births
People from Kuala Lumpur
Royal House of Selangor
Malaysian Muslims
Malaysian people of Malay descent
Selangor royal consorts
Malaysian royal consorts
First Classes of Royal Family Order of Selangor
Malaysian queens consort
Recipients of the Order of the Crown of the Realm